Park Chung-il (박정일, born November 19, 1959) is a South Korean footballer. He was first goal scorer of FC Seoul, then known as Lucky-Goldstar Hwangso.

Club career 
 1984 : Lucky-Goldstar Hwangso

References

External links
 

South Korean footballers
1959 births
Living people
FC Seoul players
K League 1 players
Association football forwards